Ictalurid herpesvirus 2 (IcHV-2) is a species of virus in the genus Ictalurivirus, family Alloherpesviridae, and order Herpesvirales.

References

External links 
 

Alloherpesviridae